Amorina (aka Amor atormentado) is a 1961 Argentine black and white film directed by Hugo del Carril and written by César Tiempo. It is based on a play by Eduardo Borrás. It stars Hugo del Carril and Tita Merello.

The film is a drama about marital infidelity. It premièred in Argentina on 6 April 1961 and the film and the performances of del Carill and Merello were well received by critics.

Cast
Tita Merello - Amorina
Hugo del Carril - Humberto
María Aurelia Bisutti - Humberto's lover
Alberto Bello - The Pshychoanalyst
Golde Flami - Amorina's sister
Alicia Paz - The daughter
Rodolfo Ranni - The son
Juan Carlos Palma -
Orestes Soriani -
Walter Reyna -
Mercedes Román -

References

External links

1961 films
Argentine romantic musical films
1960s Spanish-language films
Tango films
Films directed by Hugo del Carril
1960s romantic musical films
1960s Argentine films